Sphenomorphus fragosus is a species of lizards from the genus Sphenomorphus'' of the family Scincidae, described by Allen E. Greer and by Parker in the year 1967 in Solomon Islands in Bougainville.

References

fragosus
Species described in 1967
Taxa named by Allen Eddy Greer
Taxa named by Frederick Stanley Parker
Reptiles of the Solomon Islands